Erwin Hecht, O.M.I. (October 13, 1933 – November 19, 2016) was a Roman Catholic bishop.

Ordained to the priesthood in 1959, Hecht served as auxiliary bishop of the Roman Catholic Diocese of Kimberley, South Africa, from 1972 to 1974. He then served as bishop of the diocese from 1974 to 2009.

Notes

1933 births
2016 deaths
20th-century Roman Catholic bishops in South Africa
21st-century Roman Catholic bishops in South Africa
People from Biberach (district)
Roman Catholic bishops of Kimberley
Missionary Oblates of Mary Immaculate